Silja Tarvonen (born 4 April 1985) is a Finnish orienteering competitor and junior world champion.

She became Junior World Champion in the relay in Põlva in 2003, and in the long course in Gdańsk in 2004.

See also
 Finnish orienteers
 List of orienteers
 List of orienteering events

References

External links
 

1985 births
Living people
Finnish orienteers
Female orienteers
Foot orienteers
Junior World Orienteering Championships medalists